Stregna is a comune (municipality) in the Province of Udine in the Italian region Friuli-Venezia Giulia, located about  northwest of Trieste and about  northeast of Udine, on the border with Slovenia, and borders the following municipalities: Grimacco, Kanal ob Soči (Slovenia), San Leonardo, and Prepotto. The name of the settlement comes from the Slovene word srednje, meaning "the middle one".

Stregna localities include:
villages: Cernetig (Černeče), Clinaz (Klinac), Dughe (Duge), Gnidovizza (Gnjiduca),  Oblizza (Oblica), Podgora (Podgora), Polizza (Polica), Postregna (Podsriednje), Presserie (Preserje), Raune (Raune), Saligoi (Šalguje), Tribil Inferiore (Dolenji Tarbij), Tribil Superiore (Gorenji Tarbij), Varch (Varh) e Zamir (Zamir);
suburbs: Baiar (Bajar),  Cobilza (Kobilca), Melina (Melina), Ponte Clinaz (Klinški Malin) e Urataca.

Ethnic composition

82.7% of the population were Slovenes according to the census 1971.

Demographic evolution

References

External links
 www.comune.stregna.ud.it/

Cities and towns in Friuli-Venezia Giulia